Banksia bella, commonly known as the Wongan dryandra, is a species of dense shrub that is endemic to a restricted area of Western Australia. It has narrow, deeply serrated leaves covered with white hairs on the lower surface, heads of yellow flowers and few follicles in the fruiting head.

Description
Banksia bella is a dense, sprawling shrub that typically grows to a height of  but does not form a lignotuber. Its stems are hairy at first but become glabrous as they age. There are usually only up to two follices in each head.

Taxonomy and naming
The Wongan dryandra was first formally described in 1856 by Carl Meissner who gave it the name Dryandra pulchella in the journal Prodromus Systematis Naturalis Regni Vegetabilis. In 2007 Austin Mast and Kevin Thiele transferred all the dryandras to the genus Banksia but as there was already a plant named Banksia pulchella (teasel banksia), Mast and Thiele chose the specific epithet "bella". Pulchella is from a Latin word meaning "beautiful little" and bella is from a Latin word meaning "beautiful".

Distribution and habitat
The Wongan dryandra is only found near Wongan Hills where it grows in tall shrubland and low woodland.

References

 

bella
Plants described in 1856
Endemic flora of Southwest Australia
Eudicots of Western Australia
Taxa named by Kevin Thiele
Avon Wheatbelt